Territory located in present-day Benin.

Later known as Ajache Ipo or Ajashe (Adjatshe/Adjatché).

Ahosu = King.

Sources
 http://www.rulers.org/benitrad.html
 African States and Rulers, John Stewart, McFarland

See also
Benin
Heads of Government of Benin
Colonial Heads of Benin (Dahomey)
Lists of office-holders

African royalty